The 1976 NCAA Division III football season, part of college football in the United States organized by the National Collegiate Athletic Association at the Division III level, began in August 1976, and concluded with the NCAA Division III Football Championship in December 1976 at Garrett-Harrison Stadium in Phenix City, Alabama. The Saint John's Johnnies won their first Division III championship, defeating the Towson State Tigers by a final score of 31−28.

Conference and program changes
The Virginia College Conference (now the Old Dominion Athletic Conference) began football play in 1976.

Conference standings

Conference champions

Postseason
The 1976 NCAA Division III Football Championship playoffs were the fourth annual single-elimination tournament to determine the national champion of men's NCAA Division III college football. The championship game was held at Garrett-Harrison Stadium in Phenix City, Alabama for the fourth consecutive year. Like the previous championship, eight teams competed in this edition.

Playoff bracket

See also
1976 NCAA Division I football season
1976 NCAA Division II football season
1976 NAIA Division I football season
1976 NAIA Division II football season

References